The Cheerful Caravan (Spanish: La alegre caravana) is a 1953 Spanish musical comedy film directed by Ramón Torrado and starring Paquita Rico, Tito Sirgo and Félix Fernández.

Cast
 Paquita Rico 
 Tito Sirgo 
 Félix Fernández 
 José Nieto
 Manuel Arbó 
 Matilde Artero
 Xan das Bolas 
 Raúl Cancio 
 Aurora de Alba
 Fernando Fernández de Córdoba 
 Manuel Guitián
 Miguel Gómez
 Antonio Hernández 
 Luis Pérez de León
Manuel Requena 
Rosario Royo 
 Fernando Sancho 
 Otto Sirgo 
 Maruja Vallojera

References

Bibliography 
 de España, Rafael. Directory of Spanish and Portuguese film-makers and films. Greenwood Press, 1994.

External links 
 

1953 musical comedy films
Spanish musical comedy films
1953 films
1950s Spanish-language films
Films directed by Ramón Torrado
Fictional representations of Romani people
Suevia Films films
Spanish black-and-white films
1950s Spanish films